Samitivej PCL, doing business as Samitivej Hospitals, is a private hospital brand in Thailand. It operates hospitals and health centers in Bangkok and Chonburi Province.

It is owned by Bangkok Dusit Medical Services (BDMS), Thailand's largest private hospital company.

 40% of the patients seen at Samitivej centres are not Thai.

The centres offer halal food, and patients can get frequent flier miles.

Hospitals
Samitivej Sukhumvit Hospital is on Sukhumvit Road in Vadhana, Bangkok. Samitivej Sukhumvit, with 87 examination rooms, has 400 medical specialist staff and space for 270 patients. David A. Reisman, author of Health Tourism: Social Welfare Through International Trade, wrote that "Samitivej Sukhumvit has considerable experience with international patients." 

Samitivej Thonburi Hospital is in Thon Buri, Bangkok.

Samitivej Srinagarindra Hospital is in Suan Luang, Bangkok. 

Samitivej Sriracha Hospital is in Si Racha, Si Racha District, Chonburi Province. 

Samitivej Chonburi Hospital is in Ban Suan, Mueang Chonburi District, Chonburi Province, near Chonburi City. 

Samitivej Children's Hospital has campuses in the Sukhumvit and Srinakarin hospitals in Bangkok. Samitivej Srinakarin Children's Hospital was Thailand's sole private children's hospital in 2010.

References

External links
 Samitivej
 Samitivej Hospitals

Hospitals in Bangkok
Private hospitals in Thailand